Nowa Cerkiew  is a village in the administrative district of Gmina Chojnice, within Chojnice County, Pomeranian Voivodeship, in northern Poland. It is located within the historic region of Pomerania.

The village has a population of 592.

History

Nowa Cerkiew was a royal village of the Polish Crown, administratively located in the Człuchów County in the Pomeranian Voivodeship.

During the German occupation of Poland (World War II), the local Polish parish priest  was arrested and then murdered by the Germans in a mass execution of Poles carried out in November 1939 in the so-called Valley of Death near Chojnice (see Intelligenzaktion).

References

Nowa Cerkiew